The Earth Sciences Museum (Museu de Ciências da Terra) is a geological museum in Rio de Janeiro, Brazil. The building was part of the National Exposition of Brazil in 1908. Its collection includes minerals, fossils, and geological exhibits. The building was constructed in 1907 for the National Exposition of Brazil and was intended to be  permanent. At the exposition it was the States Pavilion.

References

Website
Website CPRM

Museums in Rio de Janeiro (city)
Geology museums in Brazil
Buildings and structures completed in 1907